Sturzenegger is a surname. It may refer to:
A. J. Sturzenegger (1888–1949), American football and baseball player and coach
Hans Sturzenegger (1875–1943), Swiss painter
Paul Sturzenegger (1902–1970), Swiss association football player
Federico Sturzenegger (born 1966), Argentine economist 

Swiss-German surnames